Gary Lynn Weaver (born March 13, 1949) is a former American football linebacker in the National Football League (NFL). He was drafted by the Oakland Raiders in the 7th round of the 1973 NFL Draft. He played college football at Fresno State.

Weaver also played for the Green Bay Packers.

References

1949 births
Living people
Sportspeople from Florence, Alabama
Players of American football from Alabama
American football linebackers
Fresno State Bulldogs football players
Oakland Raiders players
Green Bay Packers players